Greta Stoddart (born 1966) is an English poet. She is best known for her poetry collections, At Home in the Dark , Salvation Jane and Alive Alive O.

Life and career

Stoddart was born in 1966 in Henley-on-Thames, Oxfordshire. She spent her childhood in Oxford and Belgium. She studied acting in Paris and worked as a performer before becoming a full-time poet. Having taught at Goldsmiths, University of London and Bath Spa University, she now teaches for Poetry School UK.

Stoddart's first collection of poetry, At Home in the Dark, was published in 2001 and won the 2002 Geoffrey Faber Memorial Prize.

Her second collection, Salvation Jane, was published in 2009 and shortlisted for the 2008 Costa Book Award.

Her third collection, Alive Alive O, was published in 2015 and was shortlisted for the 2016 Roehampton Poetry Prize.

Her radio poem, Who’s there?, was broadcast on BBC Radio 4 and was shortlisted for the 2017 Ted Hughes Award.

References

1966 births
Living people
English women poets
People from Henley-on-Thames
21st-century English poets